This is the list of cathedrals in Malawi sorted by denomination.

Roman Catholic 
Cathedrals of the Roman Catholic Church in Malawi:
 Limbe Cathedral of Our Lady in Blantyre
 Cathedral of St. Mary in Karonga
 Maula Cathedral in Lilongwe
 Cathedral of St. Augustine in Mangochi
 St. Peter's Cathedral in Mzuzu
 Cathedral of Zomba

Anglican
Cathedrals of the Church of the Province of Central Africa:
 St. Peter's Cathedral in Likoma
 St. Paul's Cathedral in Blantyre

See also

List of cathedrals

References

External links

Cathedrals in Malawi
Malawi
Cathedrals
Cathedrals